The Birhor language is a highly endangered Munda language spoken by the Birhor people in Chhattisgarh, Odisha, West Bengal, and Maharashtra states in India.

The Birhor are found mostly in Chota Nagpur and Santhal Paragana, with the Uthlu Birhors living near Bishunpur, Gumla district, Jharkhand (along the western border with Chhattisgarh).

Status 
Most Birhor know Santali and Hindi, and a small minority know Ho. However, children still learn the language, and Birhor families use the language all the time at home. In addition, most Birhor want to be educated in their own language, and the language is used in most community affairs.

References

Roy, Sarat Chandra. 1925. The Birhors: a little-known jungle tribe of Chota Nagpur. Ranchi: K.E.M. Mission Press.

External links 
 http://projekt.ht.lu.se/rwaai RWAAI (Repository and Workspace for Austroasiatic Intangible Heritage)
 http://hdl.handle.net/10050/00-0000-0000-0003-A6AE-4@view Birhor in RWAAI Digital Archive

Munda languages
Endangered languages of India
Endangered Austroasiatic languages